The municipalities and cities are the second level administrative subdivisions of Serbia. The country is divided into 145 municipalities (38 in Southern and Eastern Serbia, 42 in Šumadija and Western Serbia, 37 in Vojvodina and 28 in Kosovo and Metohija) and 29 cities (Serbian Latin: ,; 9 in Southern and Eastern Serbia, 10 in Šumadija and Western Serbia, 8 in Vojvodina and one in Kosovo and Metohija), forming the basic level of local government.

Municipalities and cities are the administrative units of Serbia, and they form 29 districts in groups, except the City of Belgrade which is not part of any district.

A city may and may not be divided into city municipalities depending on their size. Currently, there are six cities in Serbia with city municipalities: Belgrade, Novi Sad, Niš, Požarevac, Užice and Vranje comprise several city municipalities each, divided into "urban" (in the city proper) and "other" (suburban). There are 30 city municipalities (17 in Belgrade, 5 in Niš, and 2 each in Novi Sad, Požarevac, Užice and Vranje).

Definition

Municipalities and cities

Municipalities
Like in many other countries, municipalities are the basic entities of local government in Serbia. The head of the municipality is the President of the municipality, while the executive power is held by the Municipal council, and legislative power by the Municipal assembly. Municipal assembly is elected on local elections (held every 4 years), while the President and the Council are elected by the Assembly. Municipalities have their own property (including public service companies) and budget. Only the cities officially have mayors, although the municipal presidents are often informally referred to as such.

The territory of a municipality is composed of a town (seat of the municipality) and surrounding villages (e.g. the territory of the Municipality of Čoka is composed of the town of Čoka, which is the seat of the municipality, and surrounding villages). The municipality bears the name of the seat town. Only one municipality (Municipality of Gora) does not share the name with the seat town, as the seat of that municipality is the town of Dragaš. This municipality is located in Kosovo, and thus exists only on paper. The territory of the municipality was merged with part of the Municipality of Prizren in 2000 by UNMIK to form new Municipality of Dragaš. This move is not recognised by Serbian Government (see Municipalities and cities of Kosovo section).

Advocates of reform of Serbian local self-government system point out that Serbian municipalities (with 50,000 citizens in average) are the largest in Europe, both by territory and number of residents, and as such can be inefficient in handling citizens' needs and distributing the income from the country budget into most relevant projects.

Cities and city municipalities
Cities are another type of local self-government. The territory with the city status usually has more than 100,000 inhabitants, but is otherwise very similar to municipality. There are 27 cities, each having an assembly and budget of its own. Only the cities have mayors (Serbian Latin: ,), although the presidents of the municipalities are often referred to as "mayors" in everyday usage.

As with a municipality, the territory of a city is composed of a city proper and surrounding villages (e.g. the territory of the City of Subotica is composed of the Subotica town and surrounding villages). Every city (and municipality) is part of a district. The exception is the capital Belgrade, which is not part of any district.

The city may or may not be divided into city municipalities. Six cities: Belgrade, Novi Sad, Niš, Požarevac, Užice and Vranje comprise several city municipalities. Competences of cities and these municipalities are divided. The municipalities of these cities also have their assemblies and other prerogatives. Two largest city municipalities by number of residents are the Novi Sad (307,760) and New Belgrade (212,104).

Of these six cities, only Novi Sad did not undergo the full transformation, as the newly formed municipality of Petrovaradin exists pretty much only formally; thus, the City municipality of Novi Sad is largely equated to city of Novi Sad. The city of Kragujevac had its own city municipalities from 2002 until 2008. In 2013, the city municipality of Sevojno within the city of Užice was established.

Municipalities and cities of Kosovo

Serbian law still treats Kosovo as an integral part of Serbia (officially the Autonomous Province of Kosovo and Metohija), although Kosovo declared independence in 2008. The Law on Territorial Organization defines 28 municipalities and 1 city on the territory of Kosovo. Kosovo was under official United Nations' administration (UNMIK) from 1999 to 2008. The UNMIK administration changed the territorial organisation on the territory of Kosovo. In 2000 the municipality of Gora was merged with Opolje (part of the Municipality of Prizren) into the new municipality of Dragaš and one new municipality was created: Mališevo. Later, from 2005 to 2008, seven new municipalities were created: Gračanica, Elez Han, Junik, Parteš, Klokot, Ranilug and Mamuša. However, the Government of Serbia does not recognise the territorial re-organisation of Kosovo, although some of these new-formed municipalities have Serb majority, and some Serbs participate in local elections. In three of those municipalities: Gračanica, Klokot-Vrbovac and Ranilug, Serbian parties won a majority in the 2009 elections.
 
In the Brussels Agreement, in 2013, Serbia agreed to disband its parallel municipal institutions in Kosovo, while the authorities of Kosovo agreed on creation of the Community of Serb Municipalities. However, both parties acted slowly to put this agreement in power.

List of municipalities
This is a list of the municipalities in Serbia, as defined by the Law on territorial organisation It does not include municipalities in Kosovo created by UNMIK after 1999. The data on population is taken from the 2011 census.

The census was not conducted in Kosovo, which is under administration of UNMIK, so the population numbers are not given for the municipalities in Kosovo.

1.The seat of the municipality is Dragaš
2.Incomplete coverage

List of cities and city municipalities

See also
 Administrative divisions of Serbia
 Districts of Serbia
 Cities and towns in Serbia
 Cities, towns and villages in Vojvodina
 Populated places of Serbia
 Municipalities of Kosovo

Notes and references
Notes

References

Municipalities of Serbia 2008, Statistical Office of Serbia, issued January 2009,  (Public Domain, see template:PD-SerbiaGov)

External links
Standing Conference of Towns and Municipalities of Serbia

 
Subdivisions of Serbia
Serbia 2
Serbia 2
Municipalities, Serbia
Serbia geography-related lists